The Steam-Driven Boy and other strangers is a science fiction short story collection by John Sladek, published in 1973.

Contents 
"The Secret of the Old Custard" (1966) (also known as "The Babe in the Oven")
"The Aggressor" (1969)
"The Best-Seller" (1966) 
"Is There Death on Other Planets?" (1966) 
"The Happy Breed" (1967) 
"A Report on the Migrations of Educational Materials" (1968) 
"The Singular Visitor from Not-Yet" (1968)
"The Short, Happy Wife of Mansard Eliot" (1971) 
"The Momster" (1969)
"1937 A.D.!" (1967)
"Secret Identity" (1970) 
"The Transcendental Sandwich" (1973)
"The Steam-Driven Boy" (1972)

The Parodies:

"The Purloined Butter...*dg*r *ll*n P**" (1972)
"Pemberly's Start-Afresh Calliope or, The New Proteus...H.G. W*lls" (1971)
"Ralph 4F...H*g* G*rnsb*ck (Hugogre N. Backs)" (1973)
"Engineer to the Gods...R*b*rt H**nl**n (Hitler I.E. Bonner)" (1972)
"Broot Force...*s**c *s*m*v (Iclick As-I-Move)" (1972)
"Joy Ride...R*y Br*db*ry (Barry DuBray)" (1972)
"The Moon Is Sixpence...*rth*r C. Cl*rk* (Carl Truhacker)" (1981)
"Solar Shoe-Salesman...Ph*l*p K. D*ck (Chipdip K. Kill)" (1973) 
"One Damned Thing After Another...C*rdw**n*r Sm*th (A Co-ordainer's Myth)"  (1981)
"The Sublimation World...J.G. B*ll*rd (J.G. B----)" (1968)

External links 
 

1973 books
1973 short stories
Science fiction anthologies
Panther Books books